Shafiul Islam Mohiuddin is a Bangladeshi business leader and current Member of Parliament of the Dhaka-10 area. He is the former president of Federation of Bangladesh Chambers of Commerce and Industries (FBCCI). He led the RMG sector of the country over thirty years and became the president of Bangladesh Garment Manufacturers and Exporters Association (BGMEA), the largest export earning sector of the country.

Early life and education
Mohiuddin obtained B.Com (Hon's) and M.Com degree in accountancy from University of Dhaka.

Career
Mohiuddin was involved with the RMG sector of the country over thirty years. He entered the garment industry in 1992 by establishing Onus Apparel Ltd. Since then he has started his export oriented garments industry named Onus Group, the largest export earning sector of the country. He has also successfully diversified his business in other business sectors like garment accessories, real estate, shipping, fishing, trawlers, dredging, solar energy, auto bricks, handicrafts, etc.  He has currently employed over six thousand people in his business group. He is the director of Trustee Board, BGMEA University of Fashion and Technology (BUFT). He is also the vice president of Society for Anti addiction Movement (SAAM), Centre of Excellence for Bangladesh Apparel Industry (CEBAI) and Rugby Federation, Director of Mohammedan Sporting Club Limited, Director of BGMEA Apparel Club.

Personal life
Mohiuddin married Leesa Khalid Islam in 1992 who is a first class graduate from the London School of Economics. They have one son and four daughters: Ramize Khalid Islam, puspho islam mohiuddin, Tiana Khalid Islam, Isabella Khalid Islam and Simran Khalid Islam.

References

Living people
University of Dhaka alumni
People from Dhaka
11th Jatiya Sangsad members
1955 births